IMUnited was a coalition of instant messaging service providers, including Yahoo! and Microsoft, that wanted AOL to open its proprietary AIM network to them. It appears to have disappeared, possibly because both Yahoo!'s and Microsoft's instant messaging services started to gain popularity.

See also
 IMUnified

Instant messaging